Opening Act is an American reality talent show on E! that debuted on July 9, 2012.

Premise
The series gives contestants, who are singers found via the internet, five days to prepare an opening act for a popular musical performer.

Cast
 Nigel Lythgoe
 Antonina Armato
 Martina McBride
 Pete Wentz
 Nick Cooper
 Jason Derülo
 Olivia Lee

Episodes

Broadcast
In Australia, the series premiered on September 25, 2012 on E! Australia.

References

2010s American reality television series
2012 American television series debuts
2012 American television series endings
English-language television shows
E! original programming